The 1999 Canoe Marathon European Championships were the third edition of the Canoe Marathon European Championships, which took place on 4–5 September 1999 in Gorzów, Poland. The competition was staged on the Warta river and was composed of six events – four in kayak (men's and women's K-1 and K-2) and two in canoe (men's C-1 and C-2) – all of which were contested in a distance of 38 kilometers. In parallel, four junior events were also contested in a distance of 22 kilometers.

Medal overview

Medalists

Medal table

References

Canoe Marathon European Championships
1999 in Polish sport
International sports competitions hosted by Poland
1999 in canoeing
Canoeing and kayaking competitions in Poland